Sonnenschein is a German surname meaning "sunshine" and may refer to:
 Carl Sonnenschein (1876–1929), German priest and social activist
 Edward Adolf Sonnenschein (1851–1929), English Classical Scholar and writer on Latin grammar and verse
 Franz Leopold Sonnenschein (1817–1879), German chemist
 Hugo Sonnenschein (1889–1953), Austrian writer
 Hugo F. Sonnenschein (1940–), American economist
 Jannah Sonnenschein (1940–), Dutch–Mozambican swimmer
 Rosa Sonnenschein (1847–1932), Austria-Hungary-born American founder and editor of The American Jewess
 William Swan Sonnenschein (1855–1934), English publisher
 William Teulon Swan Sonnenschein (1883–1948), barrister, Principal of Brasenose College, Vice-Chancellor of the University of Oxford

See also
 Sonnenschein Nath & Rosenthal, an international law firm
 Solomon H. Sonneschein, Hungarian-American rabbi
 "Wochenend und Sonnenschein", a song with German lyrics
 Sunshine (1999 film), a 1999 film about members of Sonnenschein family of Budapest